John Meheux (c. 1813 – 1886) was a Sierra Leonean colonial official who served as Sheriff of the Colony of Sierra Leone. Meheux was born to a Temne mother and Jean Meheux, a French merchant and trader. Meheux inherited extensive properties from his father in Kissy Road and Kissy Street. Meheux Street in Freetown, Sierra Leone commemorates the Meheux family.

References

1813 births
1886 deaths
History of Sierra Leone
Sierra Leoneans of French descent